Loose Cannons is a 2010 Italian comedy film directed by Ferzan Özpetek. Özpetek also wrote the script, with the help of Ivan Cotroneo, while Domenico Procacci served as a producer. The film stars Riccardo Scamarcio, Alessandro Preziosi, Nicole Grimaudo, Lunetta Savino, Ennio Fantastichini and Ilaria Occhini.

Loose Cannons premiered on 13 February 2010 at the 60th Berlin International Film Festival. The following month, it was theatrically released in Italy, Switzerland and Turkey. In the United States, the film premiered at the Tribeca Film Festival on 28 April 2010, where it won the Special Jury Prize. It was later screened at the Seattle International Film Festival, Provincetown International Film Festival and Palm Springs International Film Festival. In October 2010, the film was screened at the London Film Festival.

Loose Cannons received generally positive reviews from critics. It was nominated for thirteen David di Donatello Awards, including for the Best Film, winning the Best Supporting Actor for Ennio Fantastichini and the Best Supporting Actress for Ilaria Occhini. The film also earned six out of eleven nominations at the Nastro d'Argento Awards.

Plot summary 
Tommaso Cantone left his country of origin in Salento because of its retrograde and bigoted inhabitants, and for some time he has resided in Rome with his boyfriend: Marco, in fact, in the big city, he was able to create his own independence and live in the light of the sun his homosexuality. After a long time, determined to reveal his sexual orientation to his family, he returns to his homeland, where he comes to confront his middle-class parents, and a mentally different society. The Cantone are a large and bizarre family, known in Lecce for being the owner of a large industrial pasta factory. Tommaso will have to face his severe and hard father : Vincenzo, his suffocating mother : Stefania, his elder brother : Antonio, whom his father would like to be joined by Tommaso in the management of the pasta factory, and his sister : Elena, who aspires to a better life than that of a housewife. His eccentric aunt Luciana and his grandmother are also part of the numerous clan of the Cantone.

Once back in Lecce, Tommaso comes out to his brother Antonio, who is not particularly disturbed by the revelation ; however, on the evening in which Tommaso would like to reveal himself to his entire family, Antonio is the first to speak and to come out as gay himself : feeling the responsibility to carry on the family name, the man had always hidden himself, but in seeing the coming out of his brother his final sentence he had decided to do it first. In fact, the consequences of that gesture are tragic : Vincenzo kicks Antonio out of the house shortly before having a heart attack ; the whole family feels targeted by the slander and gossip of the town, while Tommaso has the whole responsibility of the pasta factory. Tommaso also lied about his university career : he has in fact declared that he had enrolled in economics and commerce, while in reality he's close to a degree in literature and his dream is to become a writer. In this, however, he finds an unexpected ally in Alba Brunetti, daughter of Vincenzo's work partner and brilliant economist, with whom Tommaso establishes an ambiguous friendship.

While the family tries to adapt to the sudden change, Tommaso feels more and more inadequate in his new responsibilities, which also leads him to neglect his boyfriend: Marco and not to be able to return to Rome as he would have liked. After a very tense confrontation with his brother, in which each of the two accuses the other of each other faults, the daily life of the Cantone is upset by the arrival of Marco together with his friends Davide, Andrea and Massimiliano : believing them to be heterosexual, Tommaso's parents welcome them in his own house, against Tommaso's wishes. Soon the extravagance of the three friends makes the family suspicious, confirming some clues about him being gay ; Meanwhile, Marco accuses his boyfriend of not being able to deal with his parents, and their relationship becomes very tense. Only shortly before departure the two manage to clarify the things between them ; once Marco and his friends are gone, Tommaso finally finds the courage to face his parents and declare that the life they have chosen for him is not the one he wants to live.

That same evening, the grandmother puts in place an extreme plan to resolve the situation : despite suffering from diabetes mellitus, she decides to eat a huge amount of sweets that leads her to her death. Since she is the largest shareholder of the pasta factory, she in her last will leaves it to Antonio, who will thus have to return to the family, and she recommends each member of the family to be himself and to respect the diversity of others. During her funeral, past and present come together in an almost dreamlike scene : her grandmother finds her beloved Nicola, her husband's brother and her only true love; Vincenzo and Antonio seem to make peace, while Tommaso watches Marco and Alba dance and, after hinting at a smile, leaves.

Cast 
 Riccardo Scamarcio as Tommaso Cantone
 Alessandro Preziosi as Antonio Cantone
 Lunetta Savino as Stefania Cantone
 Ennio Fantastichini as Vincenzo Cantone
 Nicole Grimaudo as Alba Brunetti
 Ilaria Occhini as Grandmother
 Elena Sofia Ricci as Aunt Luciana
  as Elena Cantone
 Massimiliano Gallo as Salvatore
 Daniele Pecci as Andrea
 Carolina Crescentini as Young Grandmother
  as Marco
 Paola Minaccioni as Teresa
 Gianluca De Marchi as Davide
 Mauro Bonaffini as Massimiliano
  as Patrizia
  as Domenico
  as Nicola

Release 
Loose Cannons premiered on 13 February 2010 at the 60th Berlin International Film Festival. The following month, it was theatrically released in Italy, Switzerland and Turkey. On 28 April, the film was screened at the Tribeca Film Festival, earning the Special Jury Prize. A month later, Loose Cannons was shown at the Seattle International Film Festival. In the United States, it would also be screened at the Provincetown International Film Festival and Palm Springs International Film Festival in January 2011.

Throughout 2010 and 2011, Loose Cannons was screened at film festivals such as Aruba International Film Festival, Moscow Film Festival, Durban International Film Festival, Festival do Rio and Ghent International Film Festival, and was theatrically released in France, Russia, Sweden, Germany, Poland, Austria, Portugal, Spain, Brazil, Hungary, Japan, Colombia, the Netherlands, Argentina and Philippines. In October 2010, the film was shown at the London Film Festival before being released in British cinemas.

Reception

Critical reception 
Review aggregation website Rotten Tomatoes gives the film an approval rating of 71% based on 17 reviews and an average score of 5.5/10.

Awards and nominations

Other media

Soundtrack album 

The soundtrack album for Loose Cannons was released on 12 March 2010 through Universal Music. It was produced by Pasquale Catalano, who also composed the original music for the film. The vocals were recorded by Eleonora Bordonaro, while the music was recorded by Fabrizio Romano (piano), Paolo Sasso (violin), Pietro Bentivenga (accordion), Claudio Romano (guitar), Domenico Rinaldi (oboe) and Pasquale Catalano (guitar, mandolin and harpsichord).

Track listing 
 "Sogno" by Patty Pravo
 "La linea dei ricordi" by Pasquale Catalano
 "Tutti lo sanno" by Pasquale Catalano
 "50mila" by Nina Zilli
 "Nessuno ad aspettare" by Pasquale Catalano
 "Duetto" by Pasquale Catalano
 "Una notte a Napoli" by Pink Martini
 "Sulina Waltz" by Pasquale Catalano
 "Sorry, I'm a Lady" by Baccara
 "Cuore di sabbia" by Pasquale Catalano
 "Mine vaganti" by Pasquale Catalano
 "Kutlama" by Sezen Aksu
 "Due notti" by Pasquale Catalano
 "Yara" by Radiodervish
 "La ruota pazza" by Pasquale Catalano
 "Pensiero stupendo" by Patty Pravo
 "Mais De Min" by Mariana Delgado
 "Kutlama (Reprise)" by Radiodervish

Home media 
Loose Cannons was released on DVD on 25 June 2010, and on Blu-ray on 27 August.

References

External links 
 

2010 films
2010 comedy films
Films directed by Ferzan Özpetek
Films set in Italy
Films shot in Italy
Italian comedy films
2010s Italian-language films
Italian LGBT-related films
2010 LGBT-related films
LGBT-related comedy films
Fandango (Italian company) films